Chusquea is a genus of evergreen bamboos in the grass family. Most of them are native to mountain habitats in Latin America, from Mexico to southern Chile and Argentina.

They are sometimes referred to as South American mountain bamboos. Unlike most other grasses, the stems of these species are solid, not hollow. Some animals are, to various extents, associated with stands of Chusquea, for example the Inca wren, monito del monte, and the plushcap.

Notable species
Chusquea culeou, the chilean feather bamboo or colihue cane, from southern Chile and adjacent western Argentina, is notable as the most frost-tolerant South American bamboo and the only one that has been grown successfully to any extent in the temperate Northern Hemisphere, with successful growth as an ornamental plant north to Scotland. The colihue cane was used by the Mapuches Indians to make instruments and as lances during the War of Arauco.

Chusquea quila (in Spanish quila), in contrast to Colihue, has a spreading or vining growth. It prefers wet places and does not grow above , where C. culeou becomes more dominant. Chusquea quila can form pure stands called quilantales. Very few plants can grow under this species.

In Chile Chusquea species have been historically harvested for seed by indigenous peoples, but the flowering and seeds of the species, is associated to mice vermin.

Taxonomy
The genus Chusquea now includes species formerly classified in Dendragrostis, Rettbergia, Swallenochloa, and Neurolepis.  The genus has been organized into three subgenera, subg. Rettbergia, subg. Swallenochloa and subg. Chusquea, although molecular evidence only supports a monophyletic subg. Rettbergia.

Species
193 species are accepted:

See also
List of Poaceae genera

References

External links
Photo of stems
Interactive Key to the Species of Chusquea subgenus Rettbergia of Brazil
Genera of Bamboos Native to the New World (Gramineae: Bambusoideae) by F.A. McClure

 
Bambusoideae genera
Neotropical realm flora